Uckange (Lorraine Franconian: Ickéng/Ickéngen) is a commune in the Moselle department in Grand Est in north-eastern France. The inhabitants are called Uckangeois.

Population

Notable residents
 Carmelo Micciche
 Stéphane Haar

Geography

Climate
The local climate is mild with few extremes of temperature and ample precipitation in all months. The Köppen Climate Classification subtype for this climate is "Cfb" (Marine West Coast Climate). Many areas have rainfall more than 150 days per year, although the precipitation is often of low intensity. Fog is common in autumn and winter, but thunderstorms are infrequent. Strong gales with high winds may be encountered in winter. Temperatures in the winter tend to be mild, while summer temperatures are moderate.

See also
 Communes of the Moselle department
 List of preserved historic blast furnaces

References

External links
 

Communes of Moselle (department)
Moselle communes articles needing translation from French Wikipedia